Handball Club Rabotnichki is a  handball club from Skopje.  It was established in 1948 as a section of the Sports Association Rabotnichki. HC Rabotnichki is a member of  VIP Super Liga, the top Mens handball competition organized by the Handball Federation.

History 
Rabotnichki together with the team of HC Vardar these are the oldest handball clubs in Macedonia. On 1 July 1945 in the "Working Hall" in Skopje, a Sports Department Rabotnichki has been founded, with Aleksandar Canko Hristov as president. Afterwards, many sports sections fused with Rabotnichki. Besides football, Rabotnichki sports department also organized the first volleyball match in after the war, as well as founding ski ­club and athletic club. Few months later, the basketball club Rabotnichki was also founded. The Handball Club was established in 1948. It became one of the best teams in Skopje. They won the league several times in the 50s. First one in 1950, and last 4th in 1958. The club repeated its success in 1963 winning the 5th title. HC Rabotnichki won the Cup two times, first in 1960 and then again in 1977. In the mid and late 70s Rabotnichki is experiencing a crisis and was no longer the strong first league team from the past.

In August 2013, on the occasion of the club's 65th anniversary, beach handball tournament was held in Skopje as part of the celebration ceremony. In July 2015, for the new season, in that time the new president of the club - Risto Cokrev announced bigger reinforcements so the club would be a bigger competitor in the Super League. Shortly afterwards, new reinforcements arrived, including several members of the national team. That 2015/16 season, Rabotnichki reached the playoffs and finished in the sixth place.  HC Rabotnichki received serious reinforcement in players and coaching staff. According to the mutual agreement, next season Rabotnichki team players will play in a VIP Super Liga.  Coach Stojan Petrushevski and the assistant Pepi Manaskov are part of Rabotnichki now and beside them, a dozen handball players joined the team,and participate in the strongest  competition.  The team is moving to a new Arena and now is a host at SC "Jane Sandanski".  On 9 January 2021 HC Rabotnichki made history and played its first international match against one national team of Chile. The match played at Jane Sandanski Arena Skopje finished  HC Rabotnichki vs  Chile 29:29.

Honors 

 Champions :

 Winners  (7):1950, 1954, 1955, 1956, 1958, 1963,1984

 Cup Winners

 Winners (2): 1960, 1977.

Venue 

HC Rabotnichki plays its League Matches at Jane Sandanski Arena. Jane Sandanski Arena is an indoor sports arena located in the Aerodrom Municipality of Skopje. The arena has a capacity of 7,500. It is named after the  revolutionary Jane Sandanski. The sports complex includes a 5-star hotel with a spa center, swimming pool and a sky bar. Tennis courts, fitness center and clubs headquarters are within the sports complex. Sports Centre Jane Sandanski also has an aerobics center, tennis and table tennis courts, playground for children and exclusive HUMMEL sports store and fan shop.

Team
Squad for the 2022–23 season

Former club members

Notable former players
 Nikola Markoski
 Daniel Gjorgjeski
 Mitko Stoilov
 Zlatko Mojsoski
 Velko Markoski
 Milan Levov
 Davor Palevski

Notable former coaches
 Andon Boshkovski
 Pepi Manaskov

References

External links 

 РК Работнички на Facebook
RFM Profile
EHF Profile
Работнички мина низ “мелницата“ на Металург
Handball - RK Rabotnicki Skopje (Macédoine du Nord) : palmares, résultats et identité
 Enciklopedija fizičke kulture 2, Jugoslavenski leksikografski zavod, Zagreb, 1977.

Handball clubs in North Macedonia
Rabotnichki
Sport in Skopje
Handball in North Macedonia